Martin Olof Jon Stenmarck (born 3 October 1972) is a Swedish singer. He represented Sweden in the Eurovision Song Contest 2005 with the song "Las Vegas", finishing 19th with 30 points.

Career
In 2006, Stenmarck released his first single in Swedish, "Sjumilakliv", which became one of the year's biggest hits in Sweden. The single was certified Platinum and spent 10 weeks at No. 1 on the official Swedish singles chart.

The album Nio sanningar och en lögn (Nine truths and one lie) topped the Swedish albums chart and achieved gold status in the first of its three weeks at number 1.

Stenmarck has also embarked on a voice acting career, dubbing animated films. He provided the Swedish voice for Lightning McQueen in the Disney movie Cars. Since 2011, he is the host of the TV show Kvällen är din.

He participated in Melodifestivalen 2019 with the song "Låt skiten brinna".

Discography

Albums
 2002: One
 2003: One (international version with I'm Falling added)
 2004: Think of Me (#25)
 2005: Think of Me (with Las Vegas added) (#9)
 2006: 9 sanningar och en lögn (#1)
 2007: 9 sanningar och en lögn (with three remixes added)
 2007: Det är det pojkar gör när kärleken dör (#4)
 2009: Septemberland (#10)
 2010: Kaffe på Everest
 2015: Härifrån ser jag allt!

EPs
 2005: Upp och ner sånger

Singles
 1990: "En bomb" / "Breakdown"
 2002: "The Cure for You" (#38)
 2002: "Losing Game"
 2003: "I'm Falling"
 2004: "I ljus och mörker" (duet with Viktoria Krantz)
 2004: "That's When I Love You"
 2004: "I Believe"
 2005: "Las Vegas" (#1)
 2006: "Sjumilakliv" (#1)
 2007: "Nästa dans" (#32)
 2007: "Ta undulaten"
 2007: "100 år från nu (blundar)" (#1)
 2008: "Rubb och stubb" (#26)
 2008: "A Million Candles Burning" (#1)
 2009: "1000 nålar" (#1)
 2010: "Andas"
 2010: "Everybody's Changing" (#27)
 2011: "Tonight's the Night"
 2014: "När änglarna går hem" (#41)
 2016: "Du tar mig tillbaks" (#90)
 2016: "Den svenska sommaren"
 2018: "Låt mig brinna"

Other appearances
 1997: West Side Story (sings "Vem vet?", "Maria" and "Bara du (i natt)")
 2001: Rhapsody in Rock Completely Live (sings "You're the Voice")
 2003: Rhapsody in Rock The Complete Collection (sings "Dance with the Devil")
 2004: Arn de Gothia (TV soundtrack)
 2005: Svenska musikalfavoriter (sings "Maria" from West Side Story)

References

External links

  

Eurovision Song Contest entrants for Sweden
Eurovision Song Contest entrants of 2005
Melodifestivalen winners
Swedish male voice actors
Swedish male models
1972 births
Living people
Singers from Stockholm
21st-century Swedish singers
21st-century Swedish male singers
Melodifestivalen contestants of 2019
Melodifestivalen contestants of 2016
Melodifestivalen contestants of 2014
Melodifestivalen contestants of 2005